Boorhaman is a locality in north east Victoria, Australia. There is a state forest near Boorhaman on the Ovens River plain.

References

External links

Towns in Victoria (Australia)
Rural City of Wangaratta